Leicester railway station (formerly Leicester Campbell Street and Leicester London Road) is a mainline railway station in the city of Leicester in Leicestershire, England. The station is managed by East Midlands Railway and owned by Network Rail. The station is served by CrossCountry and East Midlands Railway services.

Leicester station was opened in 1840 by the Midland Counties Railway, and rebuilt in 1894 and 1978. It is on the Midland Main Line, which runs from London St Pancras to Sheffield and Nottingham.

Background

The first station on the site opened on 5 May 1840. It was originally known simply as Leicester, becoming Leicester Campbell Street on 1 June 1867, and Leicester London Road from 12 June 1892. This was replaced in 1894 by a new station, also called Leicester London Road. Following the closure of Central on 5 May 1969, this station was renamed Leicester.
Besides London Road and Central, the city of Leicester was served by Belgrave Road, Humberstone Road and West Bridge railway stations.

History

Leicester was one of the first cities (though then a town) to be served by a railway, when the Leicester and Swannington Railway built its terminus station at West Bridge on the western side of Leicester in 1832. The Leicester and Swannington Railway was later absorbed by the Midland Railway.

In total, Leicester had seven railway stations (eight if the two sites at West Bridge are treated separately). In addition to the current Leicester station, three other main railway stations existed. The original station at West Bridge closed to passengers in 1928. Leicester Belgrave Road (on the Great Northern Railway) closed to passengers in 1962 and Leicester Central (on the Great Central Railway) closed in May 1969. From 1892 up until this time, the current Leicester station was known as Leicester London Road.

In addition, there were smaller stations within the city boundary at Humberstone Road on the LMS, Humberstone on the GNR, and, from 1874 until 1918, a halt at Welford Road was operated on the Leicester – London main line allowing access to the Cattle Market. At this halt, passengers were allowed to leave the trains but not to board them.

The station buildings

The contract for the first station on the present site was awarded by the Midland Counties Railway to Waterfield and Smith, and was just under £15,000.

It was first used on 4 May 1840, when a train of four first and six second-class carriages, pulled by the Leopard steam engine, arrived from Nottingham. As was normal in those days with a through station, the original plan was to build it to the side of the main line, but instead it was finally built on the main line with a single platform 165 yards long to handle both northbound and southbound trains.  The station was designed by William Parsons in the Grecian Revival style, with a two-storey main building which was embellished with a central pediment set forward on fluted columns in front.  This was flanked by short single-storey wings.  It was the headquarters of the Midland Counties Railway until that railway was amalgamated into the Midland Railway in 1844.  Upstairs were the company offices and boardroom, while downstairs was the booking hall, waiting and refreshment rooms.

The opening of new routes to Leicester led to steadily increasing traffic and, by 1858, a second platform had been built to handle southbound traffic, so leaving the original platform to handle northbound traffic. In 1868, it was decided to turn the southbound platform into an island platform to further increase capacity, but this was not possible with the northbound platform due to the presence of the main buildings and station entrance.

Further expansion was contemplated for some time, but it was not until 1890 that the go ahead was given for Campbell Street station to be replaced by the present Leicester railway station. All that remains of the first station is a pair of gateposts in an Egyptian style at the end of Station Street. The offices for Royal Mail now occupy some of the site of the old station buildings on Campbell Street.

The Midland Railway completely rebuilt the station between 1892 and 1894 to a design by the architect Charles Trubshaw. The new booking office was opened by the mayor in June 1892 when it was renamed Leicester London Road. The station was completed in 1894. The frontage on London Road featured four entrance archways. Above each of the left-hand pair the word "Departure" was inscribed and, above each of the other two, the word "Arrival" was carved in relief. These signs were to assist cab drivers when dropping passengers who intended to catch departing trains, or were plying for hire by passengers who had arrived by train.

The new station frontage on London Road remains as a well-preserved late Victorian building, but the interior of the booking hall and the structures on the platforms were reconstructed by Sir Robert McAlpine in 1978.

The station clock is the only hand-wound station clock in the UK.

A commemorative statue of Thomas Cook was placed on the pavement outside the present station in 1991 to mark the first excursions arranged by the travel agency magnate. It was sculpted by James Butler.

London, Midland and Scottish Railway
Until the line from Matlock to Chinley through Millers Dale was closed by the Beeching cuts, the 'main lines' were those from London to Manchester, carrying named expresses such as The Palatine. Express trains to Leeds and Scotland such as the Thames-Clyde Express tended to use the Erewash Valley Line before proceeding on to the Settle and Carlisle Line. Expresses to Edinburgh, such as The Waverley travelled through Corby and Nottingham.

British Railways
When sectorisation was introduced in the 1980s, the station was served by the InterCity sector until the privatisation of British Railways.

With the advent of power signalling in 1986, the signal box and the crossovers disappeared, and the tracks approaching the station were relaid to allow trains from any direction to enter or leave any platform.

Privatisation
Upon the privatisation of British Rail, the station became owned by Railtrack and later Network Rail; however, in common with most British railway stations, the day-to-day operation was contracted out to the largest user of the station, in this case Midland Mainline. Midland Mainline continued to refurbish the station with the installation of a large electronic departure board in the station entrance hall and smaller boards on all platforms.

In 2006, work was started on the installation of automatic ticket gates to cut down on fare evasion. Leicester City Council issued plans for the redevelopment of the station and the surrounding area including a total of eight platforms.

Re-surfacing of the platforms took place throughout 2010.

Station Masters

Samuel Tyas/Tyers 1840 - 1860
G.H. Smart 1860 - 1864
Robert Michie 1867 - 1896 (formerly station master at Newark Castle)
S.M. Bramley 1896 - 1901
William Orton 1901 - 1903
Richard William Mapp 1903 – 1919 (formerly station master at Gloucester)
C.W. Jones 1919 - 1931 (formerly station master at Kettering)
W. A. Soden 1931 - 1932 (formerly station master at Stoke, afterwards station master at Carlisle)
W. Lowis 1932 - 1940 (formerly station master at Lincoln)
Charles Edward Fry 1940 - 1943 (formerly station master at Huddersfield, afterwards station master at Leeds)
Oscar Best 1943 - 1948 (formerly station master at Huddersfield)
Arthur Johnson 1948 -1954(formerly station master at Coventry)

Station amenities

The main entrance to the station is on London Road. The ticket office and travel centre are located in the concourse; the lost property office and lockers were formerly located here also although East Midlands Trains took these facilities away in 2009 citing cost and the recession. This concourse gives access to the main station overbridge to all platforms, and via a corridor to the lifts. There is a footbridge at the northern end of the station giving access to the long-stay car park and Campbell Street.

The station is based on two island platforms which are wide with a long series of buildings. There is a newsagent and several food outlets including a licensed restaurant. There are also toilets and a large waiting room.

Midland Mainline erected a first class lounge at the southern end of the up island platforms during 2000. Passenger information systems were updated at the same time and now use dot matrix display screens. Leicester has automated announcements, which replaced the previous manual public address system in September 2011. In 2006, automatic ticket barriers were installed on all approaches to the station.

The station has an office for the British Transport Police and Cash point in the porte-cochere as well as a taxi rank and short-stay drop-off and pick-up area.

Services

Routes run north–south through Leicester on the Midland Main Line, south to Kettering, Bedford, Luton and London; and north to Derby, Nottingham, Lincoln, Sheffield and Leeds.

Leicester station is owned by Network Rail and operated under a franchise by East Midlands Railway. Most services are provided by East Midlands Railway, with CrossCountry operating on the Birmingham to Stansted Airport corridor. Due to a 15 mph maximum speed to the south of the station, as well as the size and importance of the city, all passenger trains stop at the station. Up until the winter 2008 timetable, the morning southbound The Master Cutler express from Leeds to London St Pancras was an exception although this now also calls.

Leicester is a bottleneck station as it has only four platforms. All platforms are well utilised, especially platforms two and three which receive freight as well as passenger trains.  A freight loop goes to the east of the station alongside the carriage sidings which run adjacent to platform four.

Leicester is a penalty fare station, a valid ticket or permit to travel must be shown when requested. The station offers the Plusbus scheme which allows bus and train tickets to be bought together at a saving.

Departures
Platform one –
Hourly local CrossCountry service to Birmingham New Street via Hinckley
Platform two –
Hourly fast East Midlands Railway service to Nottingham 
Hourly fast East Midlands Railway service to Sheffield
Hourly semi-fast East Midlands Railway service to Sheffield via Loughborough, Long Eaton and Derby 
Hourly semi-fast East Midlands Railway service to Nottingham via Loughborough, with peak hour services to Lincoln
Hourly CrossCountry service to Stansted Airport via Cambridge
Platform three –
Hourly fast East Midlands Railway service to London St Pancras
Hourly fast East Midlands Railway service to London St Pancras through from Sheffield
Hourly semi-fast East Midlands Railway service to London St Pancras via Market Harborough and Kettering
Second semi-fast East Midlands Railway service to London St Pancras via Market Harborough and Kettering
Hourly fast CrossCountry service to Birmingham New Street
Platform four –
Hourly East Midlands Railway 'Ivanhoe' service to Lincoln via Syston and Newark with peak hour trains to Grimsby

Future

Regeneration of the station
Prospect Leicestershire led plans which aimed to regenerate the city centre area of Leicester, the station was to be incorporated into a new business quarter. Plans for the station included to rotate the passengers facilities so that they exited into a new open city plaza rather than the current busy ring road. Renewed plans were released in 2008 for the £150 million redevelopment, promising over 2,800 new jobs in the area due to the new shops and offices which would be created. However, the 2008–2012 global recession also saw these plans fail to materialise. Network Rail and East Midlands Trains started work on a £3.5 million scheme in 2012. Platforms have been resurfaced, toilets and both first and standard class waiting areas refurbished. The majority of work has taken place in the concourse and porte corche area where a new travel centre is being provided.

Network Rail adopted a Route Utilisation Strategy for freight in 2007 which will create a new cross country freight route from Peterborough (East Coast Main Line) to Nuneaton (West Coast Main Line). One of the next stages (around 2013) will create additional lines through Leicester during a re-signalling scheme. During this period additional platforms may be provided at Leicester.

Electrification

As of 2022 the railway through Leicester is not electrified. Plans to carry out full electrification of the Midland Mainline were cancelled on 20 July 2017, after being previously announced, commenced, suspended and resumed. From 2022, services will be operated using bi-mode electro-diesel trains running in electro-pantograph mode between London St Pancras and Market Harborough, switching to electro-accumulator/diesel-electric mode northwards from there.

In the decade starting 2020 various events changed the prospects for the station even though improvements had been on and off the political agenda for over a decade. Various news outlets reported in December 2020 that prospects for electrification to Market Harborough were improving. On 23 March 2021, the Transport Select Committee published its sixth report in the Trains fit for the Future enquiry, which called for a rolling programme of electrification. It stated the Midland Main Line project would be divided into eight sections. Modern Railways confirmed that the project would continue north of Market Harborough all the way to Leicester and Sheffield.

Another major development was the publishing of the Integrated Rail Plan (IRP) on 18 November 2021. This included full Midland Main Line electrification and upgrades. F2N is still being upgraded in stages.

Ivanhoe Line
After phase one of the Ivanhoe Line was completed in the mid-1990s, it was originally planned that phase two would extend the line west to Burton upon Trent on the current freight-only line via Coalville and Ashby-de-la-Zouch. The possibility was studied in 2008 and again in 2016 but in both cases the conclusion was that the cost was not justified by the benefits.

The most recent study, in 2016, costed the work at up to £175 million and claimed that an additional 206,000 houses would need to be built along the route to generate enough passengers to make the line profitable.

See also 
Leicester Central railway station
Leicester Belgrave Road railway station
Leicester West Bridge railway station

References

External links

 Leicester Train Station Information
 Leicester Train Station Car Parking

Transport in Leicester
Railway stations in Leicestershire
Former Midland Railway stations
Railway stations in Great Britain opened in 1840
Railway stations served by East Midlands Railway
Railway stations served by CrossCountry
Charles Trubshaw railway stations
DfT Category B stations